Androphagi (cannibals, literally "man-eaters"), according to Herodotus, lived some distance north of Scythia in an area later hypothesised to be the forests between the upper waters of the Dnipro and Don. Also according to Herodotus, when King Darius the Great led a Persian invasion into Scythian territory in what is now Southern Russia, the Androphagi fled when the warring armies passed through their territory.

Etymology

Historian Marija Gimbutas has hypothesized that "Androphagoi" is a Greek translation of *mard-xwaar "man-eater" in the old North Iranian language of the Scythians. From *mard-xwaar one can derive "Mordva" or "Mordvin", the Russian name of the Finnic Erzya and Moksha peoples of east-central European Russia. From Herodotus we can deduce a location for the Androphagoi that is approximately the same as that occupied by the modern Mordvins. Max Vasmer rejected this etymology as unsubstantiated.

Ancient accounts

Herodotus first wrote of andropophagi in his Histories, where he described them as one of several tribes near Scythia.  An extra note indicates that the andropophagi are cannibals, as reflected in their name:

Pliny the Elder later wrote in his Naturalis Historia that the same cannibals near Scythia wore the scalps of men on their chest.

See also
Anthropophagi
Issedones

References

Ancient peoples of Europe
Tribes described primarily by Herodotus
Ancient Russia